NTV Amna is a Bosnian local commercial television channel based in Tešanj, Bosnia and Herzegovina. The program is mainly produced in Bosnian language.

External links 
 

Mass media in Tešanj
Television stations in Bosnia and Herzegovina
Television channels and stations established in 1997